Eslamlu Ayili (also Romanized as Eslāmlū Āyīlī; also known as Eslāmlū, Eslāmlū Chowyān, and Eslāmlū Chūpān) is a village in Qarah Bagh Rural District, in the Central District of Shiraz County, Fars Province, Iran. At the 2006 census, its population was 937, in 209 families.

References 

Populated places in Shiraz County